Shady Grove is the name of some places in the U.S. state of Oklahoma:
Shady Grove, Cherokee County, Oklahoma
Shady Grove, McIntosh County, Oklahoma
Shady Grove, Pawnee County, Oklahoma